

Tournament
The 2012 Bowl again comprised a single match. Czech Republic and Hungary (Magyar Bulls RLFC).

See also

References

External links

European rugby league competitions
2012 in rugby league